The 2006–07 Washington State Cougars men's basketball team represented Washington State University for the 2006–2007 NCAA Division I men's basketball season. The head coach was Tony Bennett. The team played its home games in Beasley Coliseum in Pullman, Washington.

Roster

Schedule

|-
!colspan=8| Exhibition

|-
!colspan=8| Regular Season

|-
!colspan=8| Pac-10 tournament

|-
!colspan=8| NCAA tournament

References

Washington State Cougars men's basketball seasons
Washington State Cougars
Washington State
Washington State
Washington State